The Régie des télécommunications du Québec (Telecommunications Board) was a quasi-judicial regulatory agency which regulated independent telephone companies (that is, those other than Bell Canada) in Quebec. 

It served as the regulator for the independent companies until April 26, 1994, when a decision by the Supreme Court of Canada in the case Téléphone Guevremont Inc. v. Quebec (Régie des télécommunications), (1994) 1 S.C.R. 878
transferred Canada's provincially regulated telephone companies to federal jurisdiction, meaning that they would be regulated by the Canadian Radio-television and Telecommunications Commission.

See also 
 International Telecommunication Union
 Inter-American Telecommunication Commission (CITEL)
 List of telecommunications regulatory bodies

Regulatory organizations in Quebec
Communications in Quebec
Communications authorities